The Wethau is a river which springs from Hohendorf, Saale-Holzland-Kreis and runs through Thuringia and Saxony-Anhalt. It flows into the River Saale at Schönburg (Saale), Burgenlandkreis.

See also
List of rivers of Saxony-Anhalt
List of rivers of Thuringia

Rivers of Saxony-Anhalt
Rivers of Thuringia
Rivers of Germany